Robert L. Wolfe (July 5, 1928 – February 28, 1981) was an American film editor. He was nominated for the Academy Award for Best Film Editing three times for All the President's Men (1976), The Rose (1979), and On Golden Pond (1981), respectively. Other notable films edited by Wolfe include The Getaway (1972), Pat Garrett and Billy the Kid (1973), The Terminal Man (1974), and The Wind and the Lion (1975).

References

External links

American film editors
1928 births
1981 deaths